Kolfinna Kristófersdóttir is a fashion model from Iceland. 



Early life 
Kolfinna Kristófersdóttir is originally from Vestmannaeyjar, Iceland.  She was working in a clothing shop when she was scouted by the local modeling agency Eskimo.  In 2011 she won second place at the Ford Models contest for Iceland.  Internationally she is represented by Next.

Career 
Kolfinna was first noticed internationally at age 19 when she walked exclusively for Marc Jacobs in New York during Fall/Winter 2012.  She next walked London and Milan, winning the London Walk-Off poll at Style.com with 42% of the vote  and being featured as a Top 10 Newcomer by Models.com.  Shows included Acne, Christopher Kane, Fendi, Marni, Prada, Topshop Unique and Versace.  Kolfinna had to sit Paris out because of a foot sprain, which she blamed on the extremely high heels she wore in London, aggravated subsequently by the intensity of her schedule in Milan.

Kolfinna has been on the cover of Russh (June–July 2012), Vision China (June 2012) and i-D (Fall 2012).

Personal life 
Kolfinna currently lives in Reykjavík.  She usually wears black, white, red and gray.  She would like to be a chef and own her own restaurant some day.  Her favorite music includes electronic acts like Burial and Aphex Twin.

References

External links 
  at the FMD.
  at Style.com.

Living people
Kolfinna Kristofersdottir
Year of birth missing (living people)
People from Vestmannaeyjar